Sarah Nasir is a female, Pakistani karateka who on February 7, 2010 won a gold medal in the 2010 South Asian Games. She was named sports ambassador for Pakistan by the country's president.

References

Pakistani female karateka
Year of birth missing (living people)
Living people
Pakistani women
South Asian Games gold medalists for Pakistan